Oleg Novachuk (born 9 February 1971) is a Kazakh businessman, and the chief executive (CEO) of KAZ Minerals.

Early life
He has a master's degree in applied mathematics from Kazakh State University.

Career
Novachuk has been CEO of Kazakhmys since 15 March 2007, having been Finance Director from 23 September 2005 to 15 March 2007, and joining the company in 2001.

From 1998 to 2001, he was deputy chairman, then chairman, of JSC Kazprombank, at that time one of the largest private banks in Kazakhstan.

Following the completion of the Restructuring of Kazakhmys PLC Novachuk continued as the CEO of KAZ Minerals PLC.

As at April 2021, he owns 39.4% of KAZ Minerals.

References

1971 births
Living people
Kazakhstani businesspeople
Al-Farabi Kazakh National University alumni
Kazakhmys